Leucotina micra, common name the tiny pyramid-shell, is a species of sea snail, a marine gastropod mollusk in the family Amathinidae, the pyrams and their allies.

Description
The length of the shell measures 2 mm.

Distribution
This endemic species occurs in the littoral zone and offshore off Tasmania, and Victoria.

References

 OBIS : Odostomia micra

External links

Amathinidae
Gastropods described in 1900